C. Krishnan may refer to:
 C. Krishnan (MDMK politician) (born 1936), member of the 14th Lok Sabha of India
 C. Krishnan (AIADMK politician), Indian politician and member of the Tamil Nadu Legislative Assembly
 C. Krishnan (Kanyakumari MLA), Indian politician and former Member of the Legislative Assembly
 C. Krishnan (CPI-M), Indian politician